The Brejoeira Palace (Portuguese: Palácio da Brejoeira) is a palace in Monção, Portugal.

The Palace was constructed in the 18th century according to a project from the architect Carlos Amarante.

It has been classified by IPPAR since 1910.

The palace opened for the public in 2010.

References

Palaces in Portugal
Buildings and structures in Monção